Ha ha ha is the sound of laughter.

Ha ha ha may also refer to:

Film
 Ha! Ha! Ha! (film), a 1934 Betty Boop animated short
 Hahaha (film), a 2010 South Korean film

Music
 Ha!-Ha!-Ha!, a 1977 album by British pop group Ultravox
 Ha Ha Ha (album), a 2012 album by Australian singer-songwriter Natalie Gauci, or the title track
 "Ha Ha Ha", a 1997 song by Eraserheads from Sticker Happy
 "Hahaha", a 2018 song by Death Grips from Year of the Snitch
 "Ha Ha Ha", a 1980 single by American rock band Flipper
 "You (Ha Ha Ha)", a 2013 song by Charli XCX from True Romance
 "Gera Gera Po", a 2014 Japanese song whose title is translated as "The Hahaha Song"

See also
 Haha (disambiguation)